The 10th Sabor was inaugurated on 22 July 2020. The assembly came into existence following the early parliamentary election on 5 July 2020 and consists of 151 representatives elected from 10 geographical and two special electoral districts.

Parliamentary officials

The Speaker of the Croatian Parliament (or President) from 22 July 2020 is Gordan Jandroković.

Vice presidents of Sabor are from government side former Speaker Željko Reiner, Ante Sanader (all HDZ) and Furio Radin (Italian minority representative) and from opposition side Sabina Glasovac (SDP) and Davorko Vidović (SD).

Composition
On the basis of the early parliamentary election of 2020, the composition of the Sabor  is as follows. There has to be noted that national minority MPs can join one other club as well beside the national minority group.

By parliamentary club

MPs by party

References

Lists of representatives in the modern Croatian Parliament by term
2020s in Croatia
Croatia